National Geographic is a Portuguese pay television channel that features documentaries produced by the National Geographic Society, owned by Walt Disney Direct-to-Consumer & International. It competes with other widely available cable channels, the Discovery Channel and Odisseia.

References

Portuguese-language television stations
Television channels and stations established in 2001
Television stations in Portugal
Portugal